The Sanctuary of Aphrodite of Aphrodisias was a sanctuary in ancient Aphrodisias dedicated to the goddess Aphrodite.

History
The site was a local cult centre based around a local fertility goddess since at least the 7th century BC. In the Hellenistic period, the local goddess came to be identified with Aphrodite, in a similar manner as the Artemis of Ephesus was originally a local goddess who came to be identified with Artemis, and the city became a pilgrimage for people from across Anatolia and the Aegean sea.

Structure
The first sanctuary is dated to the late 7th-century or early 6th-century BC.  A new and more monumental temple was erected in the 1st century BC during the Hellenistic period and financed by the wealthy freedman Zolios. The sanctuary was granted the status of asylum by the senatus consultuni de Aphrodisiensibus of 39 BC. The temple formed the center of the city and was the center of the city's prosperity.

The Temple of Aphrodite was a focal point of the town.  The Aphrodisian sculptors became renowned and benefited from a plentiful supply of marble close at hand.  The school of sculpture was very productive; much of their work can be seen around the site and in the museum.

Dissolution
The character of the temple building was altered when it became a Christian basilica.  The building is believed to have been dismantled in c. 481–484 by order of Emperor Zeno, because the temple had been the focus of Pagan Hellenic opposition against Zeno in Aphrodisias, in support of Illus, who had promised to restore Hellenic rites, which had been suppressed during the persecution of pagans in the late Roman Empire, to the temples that were still standing.

References

Temples of Aphrodite
Conversion of non-Christian religious buildings and structures into churches
1st-century BC religious buildings and structures
Persecution of pagans in the late Roman Empire
Aphrodisias